9S52 Polyana-D4 ASU is a Soviet/Russian automated command and control system for air defence troops. May act as an upper level command post (CP) of the SAM brigade including S-300V as well as the 9K37 Buk complex. And also other means, including aircraft.

Developed by Scientific Research Institute of the automatisation technics of Minradioprom. Chief designer - G.A.Burlakov. Development works started under the Decisions of the Special Commission of the Presidium of the USSR Soviet Ministry on military-industrial questions dated 
June 29, 1977 and August 27, 1981.

Mass production of the system organized at the Minsk Electromechanical Plant (currently GNPO Agat), but later transferred to Penza, former Minradioprom factory.

In service since 1986.

Polyana-D4 is a substantial remake of 9S468M1 Polyana-D1, development by NIIAA.

Etymology of the name: "Polyana" is Russian for the meadow.

Structure
 PBU (translit. Punkt Boevogo Upravleniya) of the brigade (vehicle MP06)
 Commanding-staff vehicle (KShM) of the brigade (vehicle MP02 with a trailer CP4)
 spare parts and technical service vehicle (MP45)
 two diesel electrostations ED-T400-1RAM

PBU (MP06M of Polyana-D4M) is based on a BAZ-6950 chassis.

KShM (MP02M of Polyana-D4M) is based on a Ural-375 chassis.

Modifications 
 9S52M D4M Polyana system produced by Belarusian GNPO Agat, also developers of the Buk-MB modernisation of Buk-M1.
 9S52M4 Polyana-D4M4 

Algeria 2 (2014)
Syria (2018)

See also
 9S468M1 Polyana-D1
 Ranzhir-M

References

External links
 Ground Troops Missile Protection: Forty Years of Efforts Permitted Creating the S-300V, the World's Only General-Purpose Air and ABM Defense Complex, Aleksandr Shirokorad, NVO magazine, 15–21 May 98, No. 18, p. 6
 9S52 ASU Polyana-D4 at Vestnik PVO

Military electronics of Russia
Self-propelled anti-aircraft weapons of the Soviet Union
Self-propelled anti-aircraft weapons of Russia
Military vehicles introduced in the 1980s